Joab Schneiter (born 6 August 1998) is a Swiss cyclist, who last rode for UCI ProTeam .

Major results
2016
 7th Overall Driedaagse van Axel
2018
 8th Umag Trophy
2020
 1st Stage 1 Tour de Savoie Mont Blanc
 7th Il Piccolo Lombardia

References

External links

1998 births
Living people
Swiss male cyclists
People from Bern-Mittelland District
Sportspeople from the canton of Bern